The 2016 World RX of Norway was the fifth round of the third season of the FIA World Rallycross Championship and the fourth round of the forty-first season of the FIA European Rallycross Championship. The event was held at the Lånkebanen near Hell, Nord-Trøndelag.

It was a historic win for home driver Andreas Bakkerud, who became the first driver to win all four qualifying heats, their semi-final and the final in one weekend.

Supercar

Heats

Semi-finals
Semi-Final 1

Semi-Final 2

Finals

RX Lites

Heats

Semi-finals
Semi-Final 1

Semi-Final 2

Final

Standings after the event

Supercar standings

RX Lites standings

 Note: Only the top five positions are included.

References

External links

|- style="text-align:center"
|width="35%"|Previous race:2016 World RX of Great Britain
|width="30%"|FIA World Rallycross Championship2016 season
|width="35%"|Next race:2016 World RX of Sweden
|- style="text-align:center"
|width="35%"|Previous race:2015 World RX of Norway
|width="30%"|World RX of Norway
|width="35%"|Next race:2017 World RX of Norway
|- style="text-align:center"

Norway
World RX
World RX